The Goyder state by-election, 1974 was a by-election held on 8 June 1974 for the South Australian House of Assembly seat of Goyder. This was triggered by the resignation of former Premier and Liberal and Country League/Liberal Movement MHA Steele Hall, who resigned to run for the Australian Senate at the 1974 federal election. Created and first contested at the 1970 state election, the seat had been held by the Liberal parties since its creation. Hall won the seat at the 1973 state election as an LCL candidate but afterward changed to the LM.

Results
D D Gardner, who contested the previous election as an independent on 17.6 percent, stood under the LCL banner at the by-election. The Liberal Movement easily retained the seat.

See also
List of South Australian state by-elections

References

South Australian state by-elections
1974 elections in Australia
1970s in South Australia
June 1974 events in Australia